Egnasia ocellata is a moth of the family Noctuidae. It is found in Sri Lanka. Wingspan is 22mm. Body is dull red-brown color. Fore wing with traces of five waved lines angled below the costa. Reniform greyish with a dark center. Hind wing with traces of a dark antemedial band, on which is a black-centered grey spot on the discocellulars. Both wings are with lunulate marginal line. Underside of wings slightly suffused with grey.

References

Moths of Asia
Moths described in 1885